Nobuyuki (written: , , , , , , , , , , ,  or ) is a masculine Japanese given name. Notable people with the name include:

, Japanese general, politician and Prime Minister of Japan
, Japanese footballer
, Japanese gymnast
, Japanese manga artist
, Japanese fencer
, Japanese sumo wrestler
, Japanese baseball player
, Japanese manga artist
, Japanese voice actor
, Japanese footballer
, Japanese chief executive
, Japanese handball player
, Japanese video game developer
, Japanese gymnast
, Japanese footballer
, Japanese actor and voice actor
, Japanese voice actor
, Japanese footballer
, Japanese daimyō
, Japanese freestyle skier
, Japanese samurai
, Japanese footballer
, Japanese footballer
, Japanese engineer
, Japanese samurai and daimyō
, Japanese marathon runner
, Japanese actor
, Japanese actor
, Japanese manga artist
, Japanese botanist
, Japanese daimyō
, Japanese pianist and composer
, Japanese shogi player
, Japanese footballer

Fictional characters
, a character in the light novel series Sword Art Online

See also
27716 Nobuyuki, a main-belt asteroid

Japanese masculine given names